Caspar Schrøder (5 December 1905 – 25 April 1989) was a Danish fencer. He competed in the individual and team foil and team épée events at the 1936 Summer Olympics.

References

External links
 

1905 births
1989 deaths
People from Norddjurs Municipality
Danish male fencers
Olympic fencers of Denmark
Fencers at the 1936 Summer Olympics
Sportspeople from the Central Denmark Region